Joseph Maurice Leo "Moe" Benoît (July 26, 1932 – December 10, 2013) was a Canadian professional hockey defenceman.

Benoît was born in Valleyfield, Quebec and started playing professional hockey in 1948 for the Montreal Royals. After a five-year break he began playing again for the Trois-Rivières Lions. He had successful seasons with the Belleville McFarlands—the 1959 Team Canada that won the World Championships in Prague, Czechoslovakia. and also played for the Kingston Frontenacs in the late fifties. Benoît helped the Canadian Olympic Hockey Team get the silver medal in the 1960 Winter Olympics.

After his Olympic success he moved to the United States, where he was a player (and also a coach) for the Omaha Knights and Toledo Blades. In 1966 Benoît joined the Dayton Gems with whom he played until his retirement in 1970. He won Turner Cup twice—with the Blades in 1964, as the player-coach, and with the Gems in 1969, also sharing IHL 1968-69 best defenceman award with his teammate Alain Beaulé. Benoît also coached numerous youth hockey teams in Dayton throughout the 1970s. Benoît was inducted into the Dayton Hockey Hall of Fame in 1973 and died December 10, 2013 in Dayton, Ohio.

External links
 "Gems stars biography"
 
 Maurice Benoît's obituary

1932 births
2013 deaths
Canadian ice hockey defencemen
French Quebecers
Ice hockey players at the 1960 Winter Olympics
Sportspeople from Salaberry-de-Valleyfield
Medalists at the 1960 Winter Olympics
Olympic ice hockey players of Canada
Olympic medalists in ice hockey
Olympic silver medalists for Canada
Quebec Senior Hockey League players
Trois-Rivières Lions (1955–1960) players
Ice hockey people from Quebec
Omaha Knights (IHL) players
Toledo Blades players
Dayton Gems players